Schoenefeldia is a genus of Asian and African plants in the grass family.

 Species
 Schoenefeldia gracilis Kunth - Sahara and Sahel from Cape Verde + Algeria to Ethiopia; Saudi Arabia, Yemen, India, Pakistan
 Schoenefeldia transiens Chiov. - eastern + southeastern Africa from Ethiopia to Mpumalanga

References

Chloridoideae
Poaceae genera